"Warrior" is a song by American heavy metal band Disturbed. It was released on 3 March 2011, as the fourth single from their album Asylum.

Background
The song was featured on Disturbed's Asylum Interactive Game, used to promote the album. Before being released as a single, "Warrior" peaked at number three on the Billboard Bubbling Under Hot 100.

Music video
A newly announced music video was directed by Chris Marrs Piliero, however, Disturbed's frontman David Draiman stated on his Twitter page that the video was canceled.

Charts

Weekly charts

Year-end charts

References

Disturbed (band) songs
2010 songs
Reprise Records singles
Songs written by Dan Donegan
Songs written by David Draiman
Songs written by Mike Wengren